Binary system may refer to:

 Binary number system, the base-2 internal "machine language" of computers 
 Binary opposition, a bipolar distinction in philosophy, structuralism and critical theory 
 Binary system (astronomy), a system of two celestial bodies on a mutual orbit
 Binary asteroid
 Binary star
 Contact binary
 Contact binary (asteroid)
 Double planet
 In chemistry, a system involving two steps, processes or substances 
 Mixture 
 Azeotrope 
 Binary System, a music duo featuring rock musician Roger Miller
 Binary Systems (Aberdeen) is a Graphic Design company based in Aberdeen, Scotland
 

ca:Sistema binari
pt:Binário